The Jakarta International e-Prix Circuit is a racing circuit in the Ancol, Jakarta. It was built for the Jakarta ePrix of the single-seater, electrically powered Formula E championship. The first edition of Jakarta ePrix was held here in 2022.

Background

The proposal of the Jakarta ePrix was first announced in July 2019, with mid-2020 announced as the target date for an inaugural race. The originally intended location, the National Monument and the Merdeka Square was rejected along with a proposal for the use of the Gelora Bung Karno Stadium. Originally, there were 5 options being proposed: Jenderal Sudirman Street, Indah Kapuk Beach, Jakarta International Expo, Jakarta International Stadium, and the Ancol region. With the Ancol region being announced as the location in January 2022.

This circuit has been under construction since 2022. In January 2022, the Governor of Jakarta, Anies Baswedan, inaugurated the Jakarta International e-Prix Circuit. The track's construction was completed a week before the ePrix week.

Layout
The circuit has 18 corners. The circuit layout is inspired by the Kuda lumping horse and is driven clockwise. Turn 1 is a wide right-hander with multiple choices of racing lines which generates ample overtaking opportunities, followed by two right-handers and two fast left-handers approaching the mall straight. The double left-right 90-degree turns after the mall straight is continued by a tricky and fast S-section, into a straight. The Turn 13 hairpin is the hardest braking zone in the track, followed by a right-left kink. Turn 16 has widening and banking on the outside line to accommodate the attack-mode activation zone. The lap ends with a fast left-hander and a sharp right-hander. Formula E driver Lucas di Grassi has described the track as, "having a good mixture of low, medium and high-speed corners and will test every aspect of car performance."

Lap records 

The official race lap records at the Jakarta International e-Prix Circuit are listed as:

See also

 Jaya Ancol Circuit (Indonesia's first motor racing circuit, located adjacent to the current e-Prix circuit)

References

Formula E circuits
North Jakarta
Sports venues in Jakarta
Motorsport venues in Indonesia
2022 establishments in Indonesia